Tjörn Runt is an annual long distance sailing competition that takes place in Sweden around the island of Tjörn. The race has been held on the third Saturday of August every year since 1963.  About 1,000 sailing boats sail the  around Tjörn each year. Tjörn Runt is arranged by Stenungsunds Segelsällskap.

Course
The start takes place with start in Stigfjorden 2013 and the race proceeds counterclockwise around the island, with the finishing line in Askeröfjorden outside Stenungsön. 

1963 establishments in Sweden
Annual sporting events in Sweden
Recurring sporting events established in 1963
Sailing competitions in Sweden
Sport in Västra Götaland County
Summer events in Sweden